Paul Brian Matey (born March 29, 1971) is an American attorney who is a United States circuit judge of the United States Court of Appeals for the Third Circuit. Prior to Matey's judicial service, he was a partner in the White Collar Criminal Defense and Litigation practice groups at the law firm of Lowenstein Sandler LLP. He was previously Senior Vice President, General Counsel, and Secretary at University Hospital in Newark, New Jersey.

Education 
Born in Edison, New Jersey and raised in Rahway, New Jersey, Matey earned his Bachelor of Arts from the University of Scranton in 1993, and his Juris Doctor, summa cum laude, from Seton Hall University School of Law in 2001, where he served as editor-in-chief of the Seton Hall Law Review.

Legal career 

After graduating from law school, Matey served as a law clerk to Judge John C. Lifland of the United States District Court for the District of New Jersey from 2001 to 2002 and to Judge Robert Cowen of the United States Court of Appeals for the Third Circuit from 2002 to 2003. He spent two years as a litigation associate at the Washington, D.C., law firm Kellogg, Hansen, Todd, Figel & Frederick. Matey then worked as an Assistant United States Attorney for the District of New Jersey, where he prosecuted matters including complex white-collar crimes and child protection actions, and received the Director's Award for Superior Performance from the United States Department of Justice. From 2010 to 2015, Matey served as senior counsel and then as deputy chief counsel to New Jersey Governor Chris Christie. He was senior vice president, general counsel, and secretary of University Hospital in Newark from 2015 to 2018. In September 2018, Matey became a partner at Lowenstein Sandler in Roseland, New Jersey. He has served in multiple positions within the Federalist Society.

Federal judicial service 

On April 10, 2018, President Donald Trump announced his intent to nominate Matey to serve as a United States Circuit Judge of the United States Court of Appeals for the Third Circuit. On April 12, 2018, his nomination was sent to the Senate. He was nominated to the seat vacated by Judge Julio M. Fuentes, who assumed senior status on July 18, 2016. On November 13, 2018, a hearing on his nomination was held before the Senate Judiciary Committee.

On January 3, 2019, his nomination was returned to the President under Rule XXXI, Paragraph 6 of the United States Senate. On January 23, 2019, President Trump announced his intent to renominate Matey for a federal judgeship. His nomination was sent to the Senate later that day. On February 7, 2019, his nomination was reported out of committee by a 12–10 vote. On March 11, 2019, the Senate invoked cloture on his nomination by a 50–44 vote. On March 12, 2019, his nomination was confirmed by a 54–45 vote. He received his judicial commission on March 18, 2019.

References

External links 
 
 

1971 births
Living people
21st-century American lawyers
21st-century American judges
Assistant United States Attorneys
Federalist Society members
Judges of the United States Court of Appeals for the Third Circuit
Lawyers from Washington, D.C.
People from Edison, New Jersey
People from Rahway, New Jersey
New Jersey lawyers
Seton Hall University School of Law alumni
United States court of appeals judges appointed by Donald Trump
University of Scranton alumni